VFU may stand for:
Varna Free University, a university in Bulgaria
Verksamhetsförlagd utbildning (English: "Workplace training"), the practical school placement part of teacher education in Sweden
Veterinární a farmaceutická univerzita Brno, a veterinary and pharmacy university in the Czech Republic
Victorian Farmers' Union, an Australian farmers' organisation and political party
Voice from the Underground, an American politics and pop culture podcast known by its acronym, VFU Podcast.